The  was a professional wrestling championship in the Japanese promotion DDT Pro-Wrestling. The title was introduced in 2011, in DDT's parodic sub-brand New Beijing Pro-Wrestling.

History
In storyline, this title was once held by Chinese historical figures Yuan Shao and Yuan Shu who were the 17th champions, before Choun Shiryu and Cao Zhang won them in April 2011, in New Beijing Pro-Wrestling, a DDT sub-brand that parodied New Japan Pro-Wrestling and Chinese history. The titles were only contested a handful of times throughout 2011, mostly in Union Pro-Wrestling, another sub-brand of DDT, where the title belts were actually unveiled in May 2011.

Reigns

Combined reigns

By team

By wrestler

See also

DDT Pro-Wrestling
Professional wrestling in Japan

Footnotes

References

DDT Pro-Wrestling championships
Tag team wrestling championships